11:11, 11-11, or 11/11 may refer to:

11:11 (numerology)
Eleven Eleven, the literary journal of California College of the Arts
11.11, also known as Singles Day, a day for unmarried people, popular among Chinese youth
Double eleven (11.11) shopping festival in Asia.

Dates
Armistice with Germany or "the eleventh of the eleventh"
November 11
November 1911
November 2011
1111

In music 
Eleveneleven, record label founded by Ellen DeGeneres
 Eleven Eleven, an album by Dave Alvin (2007)
 Eleven Eleven (Dinosaur Pile-Up album) (2016)
11:11 (Come album) (1992)
11:11 (Sasha Sökol album) (1997)
11:11 (Regina Spektor album) (2001)
11:11 (Maria Taylor album) (2005)
11:11 (Mac Lethal album) (2007)
11:11 (Pinegrove album) (2022)
11:11 (Rodrigo y Gabriela album) (2009)
 "11:11" (Taeyeon song) (2016)
 11:11, an album by Danny Romero (2018)
11:11 (Maluma album) (2019)
 11-11, a 2004 album by Voicst
 "11:11", a single by Austin Mahone
 "11:11 PM", a song by All-American Rejects from the 2005 album Move Along
 "11:11", a song by Hanzel Und Gretyl from the 2003 album Über Alles
 "11/11", a song by Team Sleep from the 2005 album Team Sleep
 "11:11", a song by Rufus Wainwright from the 2003 album Want One
 "11:11", a song by Andrew Bird's Bowl of Fire from the album The Swimming Hour
 "11:11", a song by Arkells from the 2014 album High Noon
 "11:11", a song by Kind of Like Spitting from the 2000 album $100 Room
 "11:11", a song by Dinosaur Pile-Up from the 2016 album Eleven Eleven
 "Condition 11:11", a song by Defiance, Ohio from the 2006 album The Great Depression

See also 
 11 (number)
 Chapter 11, Title 11, United States Code

Date and time disambiguation pages